The 2018–19 CESAFI season was the 18th season of the Cebu Schools Athletic Foundation, Inc., the preeminent inter-scholastic sports competition in Cebu. The 2018–19 season will be the first season of the CESAFI under president Bernard Nicolas Villamor, of Cebu Institute of Technology–University.

This season marks the first appearance of University of Cebu – Lapu-Lapu and Mandaue Campus (UC–LM) as a regular member. UC–LM will compete as a separate school from sister school University of Cebu, but will carry the same nickname as the latter, the Webmasters. Aside from UC–LM, the Sisters of Mary–Boystown will also compete in select events as a guest member.

For the first time in the league's history, an Under-12 Division will be added to the fold, with basketball, chess, and football being the inaugural sports in the new division. In addition, weightlifting will also be making its debut as a demonstration sport.

Basketball

Men's basketball

Elimination round

Results
Results on top and to the right of the gray cells are from first-round games; those to the bottom and to the left of it are from second-round games.

Playoffs

Bracket

Semifinals

USJ-R vs. USC
{{basketballbox|bg=#eee|date=October 20, 2018 |time=4:30 p.m |place=Cebu Coliseum, Cebu City |report=Match report
|teamA= |scoreA=80
|teamB= USC Warriors |scoreB=66
|series=USJ-R wins series in one game
}}

UV vs. UC

Third-place game

Finals
This is the fifth finals meeting in the CESAFI between USJ-R and UV, with all four previous meetings in 2002, 2003, 2004, and 2008 being the most recent, all won by UV. UV won the series in three games, its third title in three years, completing a three-peat, as well as winning their 13th CESAFI men's basketball title.

Awards
 Most Valuable Player:''' Rey Anthony Suerte (UV Green Lancers)

References

External links
 Official website
 

2018 in Philippine sport
2019 in Philippine sport